Podgorci may refer to:
 Podgorci, Struga, North Macedonia
 Podgorci, Ormož, Slovenia